Annapurna III is a mountain in the Annapurna mountain range located in Nepal, and at  tall, it is the 42nd highest mountain in the world and the third highest peak of the Annapurna mountain range (Annapurna Fang is technically taller at , but lacks the prominence to be considered a fully independent peak).

History 
It was first ascended 6 May 1961 by an Indian expedition led by Capt. Mohan Singh Kohli via the Northeast Face. The summit party comprised Mohan Kohli, Sonam Gyatso, and Sonam Girmi. A Japanese Women's expedition led by Junko Tabei succeeded in putting the first women on top on 19 May 1970.

Several teams had attempted to summit Annapurna III via the southeast ridge, with all efforts prior to 2021 ending in failure. The first attempt up this ridge was in 1981 by Nick Colton and Tim Leach who reached about 1000 feet below the peak before turning around. Twice in 2010, Pete Benson, Nick Bullock and Matt Helliker unsuccessfully attempted the southeast ridge. Their first attempt started at the southeast pillar, and the second attempt started at the east ridge where the team began by flying a helicopter into basecamp to save time. In 2016, David Lama filmed a documentary of his unsuccessful attempt up the southeast ridge along with Hansjörg Auer and Alex Blümel winning the UIAA awarded the Best Climbing Film. 

The first ascent of the southeast ridge ascent was made on 6th November 2021 by Mykyta Balabanov, Vyacheslav Polezhayko and Mykhailo Fomin. The route was considered one of the unfinished challenges in the Himalayas and is about 28,00-3,000 meters on a vertical face whose crux emerges in the form of a technically demanding chimney shown in the video of the 2016 attempt. It was the second attempt by this Ukrainian expedition, the first one being in 2019.  They won a "Special Jury Award" at the 2022 Piolet d'Or for their ascent.

References

External links 

 Annapurna III – Unclimbed, a short documentary by David Lama

Seven-thousanders of the Himalayas
Mountains of the Gandaki Province